This list of the non-marine molluscs of Ireland comprises 169 species of non-marine molluscs that have been recorded as part of the fauna of Ireland. Ireland is an island in the northeastern Atlantic. It consists of the Republic of Ireland, also known simply as Ireland (or in the Irish language Éire), and Northern Ireland, which is part of the United Kingdom.

Included in the list are terrestrial gastropods (land snails and slugs) and freshwater and brackish water gastropods and bivalves (mussels and clams). Molluscs that are fully adapted to live in the sea are not included here, except for one marine pulmonate snail that breathes air. Some species of gastropods listed (e.g. Peringia ulvae) live in habitats that are intermediate between freshwater and saltwater. Others live in habitats that are intermediate between land and saltwater. Both of these kinds of species are often also included in marine faunal lists.
In addition to the species that live naturally outdoors in Ireland, there are at least 2 aquatic gastropod species which live only in artificially-heated indoor environments such as aquaria in greenhouses. These are known as "hothouse aliens", and in this list they are not counted as part of the total fauna.

The mollusc fauna of the island of Ireland has not been as thoroughly researched as that of the island of Great Britain, and therefore it is possible that some uncommon and local species (whether native or introduced) may, as yet, have been overlooked. Even so, it seems that the non-marine molluscan fauna of Ireland is a smaller fauna than that of Great Britain. 

The following table shows a summary of species numbers. It is not always easy to define which species are aquatic and which are terrestrial, as some species such as Galba truncatula are virtually amphibious. It also can be difficult to determine which species are introduced, as some introductions are quite ancient, for example from the Paleolithic. Those species that do not have a shell usually do not leave an archaeological or fossil record, and therefore it is especially difficult to determine whether they are native or introduced.

Conservation 
Species protected by EU Habitats Directive include: Geomalacus maculosus (annex II and IV), Vertigo angustior, Vertigo geyeri, Vertigo moulinsiana (annex II) and Margaritifera margaritifera (annex II and V).

Two species have been protected by the Wildlife Act of 1976 since 1990: Geomalacus maculosus and Margaritifera margaritifera. They were added by regulation SI 112/1990.

A recent regional red list has been published of the non-marine molluscs of Ireland by Byrne et al. (2009). In this publication, the threat status of 150 native species was evaluated using IUCN regional guidelines. Of these species, two are considered to be regionally extinct, five critically endangered, fourteen endangered, twenty-six vulnerable, six near threatened, and the rest of least concern, or data deficient. This publication has sparked some media discussion about molluscan conservation in Ireland, including articles written in the Irish Times.

Regional Red List of Irish non-marine molluscs 
The following species have been assigned threat categories or were considered regionally extinct on the island of Ireland in 2009:

Regionally extinct (RE)
Helicigona lapicida (Linnaeus, 1758); Omphiscola glabra (O.F. Müller, 1774) – listed as extinct in the red list, but rediscovered in 2009.

Critically Endangered (CR)
Pisidium conventus Clessin, 1877
Pomatias elegans (O.F. Müller, 1774)
Margaritifera margaritifera (Linnaeus, 1758)
Truncatella subcylindrica (Linnaeus, 1767)
Margaritifera durrovensis Philips, 1928

Endangered (EN)
Gyraulus laevis (Alder, 1838)
Pisidium pulchellum Jenyns, 1832
Hydrobia acuta neglecta (Muus, 1963)
Pupilla muscorum (Linnaeus, 1758)
Mercuria cf. similis (Draparnaud, 1805)
Quickella arenaria (Potiez & Michaud, 1835)
Merdigera obscura (O.F. Müller, 1774)
Spermodea lamellata (Jeffreys, 1830)
Myxas glutinosa (O.F. Müller, 1774)
Succinella oblonga Draparnaud, 1801
Pisidium moitessierianum Paladilhe, 1866
Vertigo moulinsiana (Dupuy, 1849)
Pisidium pseudosphaerium Schlesch, 1947
Vertigo pusilla O.F. Müller, 1774

Vulnerable (VU)
Acicula fusca (Montagu, 1803)
Pisidium lilljeborgii Clessin, 1866
Anisus vortex (Linnaeus, 1758)
Radix auricularia (Linnaeus, 1758)
Anodonta anatina (Linnaeus, 1758)
Sphaerium nucleus (Studer, 1820)
Anodonta cygnea (Linnaeus, 1758)
Tandonia rustica (Millet, 1843)
Aplexa hypnorum (Linnaeus, 1758)
Testacella haliotidea Draparnaud, 1801
Arianta arbustorum (Linnaeus, 1758)
Vallonia pulchella (O.F. Müller, 1774)
Balea perversa (Linnaeus, 1758)
Ventrosia ventrosa (Montagu, 1803)
Cecilioides acicula (O.F. Müller, 1774)
Vertigo angustior Jeffreys, 1830
Cochlodina laminata (Montagu, 1803)
Vertigo antivertigo (Draparnaud, 1801)
Helicella itala (Linnaeus, 1758)
Vertigo geyeri Lindholm, 1925
Leiostyla anglica (A. Férussac, 1821)
Vertigo lilljeborgi (Westerlund, 1871)
Limax cinereoniger Wolf, 1803
Zenobiella subrufescens (J.S. Miller, 1822)
Musculium lacustre (O.F. Müller, 1774)
Zonitoides excavatus (Alder, 1830)

Systematic list
The list is arranged by biological affinity, rather than being alphabetical by family.

A number of species are listed with subspecies, in cases where there are well-recognized subspecies in different parts of Europe. For some species a synonym is given, where the species may perhaps be better known under another name.

An attempt has been made to label the families as aquatic, terrestrial or intermediate, and an indication is given where it is thought that the species is introduced. Species are considered to be native, unless otherwise indicated; that information is mostly taken from Kerney, and Rowson et al. The status and taxonomy of freshwater gastropods has been updated according to Rowson et al. (2021).

Gastropoda

 Neritidae – aquatic (also tolerates brackish water)
 Theodoxus fluviatilis fluviatilis (Linnaeus, 1758)

 Aciculidae – terrestrial
 Acicula fusca (Montagu, 1803)

 Viviparidae (river snails) – aquatic
 Viviparus viviparus (Linnaeus, 1758)

 Assimineidae – terrestrial (intermediate marine)
 Assiminea grayana Fleming, 1828 – introduced

 Truncatellidae – terrestrial (intermediate marine)

 Truncatella subcylindrica (Linnaeus, 1758)

 Bithyniidae – aquatic

 Bithynia leachii (Sheppard, 1823)
 Bithynia tentaculata (Linnaeus, 1758)
 Potamopyrgidae – aquatic
 Potamopyrgus antipodarum (Gray, 1843) – introduced
 Hydrobiidae – aquatic (some are arguably marine)
 Hydrobia acuta (Draparnaud, 1805) – subspecies: Hydrobia acuta neglecta Muus, 1963
 Ecrobia ventrosa (Montagu, 1803) – synonym: Ventrosia ventrosa
 Peringia ulvae (Pennant, 1777)
 Mercuria anatina (Poiret, 1801) – synonyms: M. confusa auct. non Frauenfeld, 1863, M. similis auct. non (Draparnaud, 1805)

 Valvatidae (valve snails) – aquatic
 Valvata cristata O.F. Müller, 1774
 Valvata piscinalis (O.F. Müller, 1774)

 Pomatiidae (land winkles) – terrestrial
 Pomatias elegans (O.F. Müller, 1774)

The following gastropods are pulmonates:

 Ellobiidae (hollow-shelled snails) – terrestrial or semi-marine
 Carychium minimum O.F. Müller, 1774
 Carychium tridentatum (Risso, 1826)
 Leucophytia bidentata (Montagu, 1808)
 Myosotella denticulata (Montagu, 1803)
 Myosotella myosotis (Draparnaud, 1801)

 Otinidae – aquatic (almost fully marine, but a pulmonate)
 Otina ovata (Brown, 1827)

 Lymnaeidae – aquatic
 Ampullaceana balthica (Linnaeus, 1758) – synonyms: Radix balthica, Radix peregra auct. non (O.F. Müller, 1774)
 Galba truncatula (O.F. Müller, 1774)
 Lymnaea stagnalis (Linnaeus, 1758)
 Myxas glutinosa (O.F. Müller, 1774) E
 Omphiscola glabra (O.F. Müller, 1774) – found in 2009 at one site in the SE of Ireland, but listed as extinct on a local red list (2009).
 Radix auricularia (Linnaeus, 1758)
 Stagnicola fuscus (C. Pfeiffer, 1821) – synonym: Lymnaea fusca

 Physidae (bladder snails) – aquatic

 Aplexa hypnorum (Linnaeus, 1758)
 Physa fontinalis (Linnaeus, 1758)
 Physella acuta (Draparnaud, 1805) = Physella heterostropha (Say, 1817) – introduced
 Physella gyrina (Say, 1821) – introduced

 Planorbidae (ramshorn snails) – aquatic

 Ancylus fluviatilis (O.F. Müller, 1774)
 Anisus leucostoma (Millet, 1813)

 Anisus vortex (Linnaeus, 1758)
 Anisus vorticulus (Troschel, 1834)
 Anisus spirorbis (Linnaeus, 1758)

 Bathyomphalus contortus (Linnaeus, 1758)
 Gyraulus albus (O.F. Müller, 1774)
 Gyraulus crista (Linnaeus, 1758)
 Gyraulus laevis (Alder, 1838)
 Hippeutis complanatus (Linnaeus, 1758)
 Planorbarius corneus corneus (Linnaeus, 1758)
 Planorbis carinatus O.F. Müller, 1774

 Planorbis planorbis (Linnaeus, 1758)

 Acroloxidae (river limpets) – aquatic
 Acroloxus lacustris (Linnaeus, 1758)

 Succineidae (amber snails) – terrestrial (some almost amphibious)
 Quickella arenaria (Potiez & Michaud, 1838) = Catinella arenaria
 Succinella oblonga Draparnaud, 1801
 Succinea putris Linnaeus, 1758
 Oxyloma elegans elegans (Risso, 1826) = Oxyloma pfeifferi (Rossmässler, 1835)
 Oxyloma sarsii (Esmark, 1886)

 Cochlicopidae – terrestrial
 Cochlicopa c.f. lubrica = Cochlicopa lubrica (O.F. Müller, 1774)
 Cochlicopa c.f. lubricella = Cochlicopa lubricella (Rossmässler, 1835)

 Pyramidulidae – terrestrial
 Pyramidula pusilla (Vallot, 1801)
 Vertiginidae (whorl snails) – terrestrial
 Columella edentula Draparnaud, 1805)
 Columella aspera Walden, 1966

 Vertigo antivertigo (Draparnaud, 1801)
 Vertigo geyeri Lindholm, 1925
 Vertigo lilljeborgi (Westerlund, 1871)
 Vertigo moulinsiana (Dupuy, 1849)
 Vertigo pusilla O.F. Müller, 1774
 Vertigo pygmaea (Draparnaud, 1801)
 Vertigo substriata (Jeffreys, 1833)
 Vertigo angustior Jeffreys, 1830

 Pupillidae – terrestrial
 Pupilla muscorum (Linnaeus, 1758)
 Pupilla alpicola (Charpentier, 1837)

 Lauriidae – terrestrial
 Leiostyla anglica (Wood, 1828)
 Lauria cylindracea (da Costa, 1778)

 Valloniidae – terrestrial
 Vallonia costata (O.F. Müller, 1774)
 Vallonia pulchella (O.F. Müller, 1774)
 Vallonia c.f. excentrica = Vallonia excentrica Sterke, 1892
 Acanthinula aculeata (O.F. Müller, 1774)
 Spermodea lamellata (Jeffreys, 1830)

 Enidae – terrestrial
 Merdigera obscura = Ena obscura (O.F. Müller, 1774)

 Punctidae (dot snails) – terrestrial
 Punctum pygmaeum (Draparnaud, 1801)

 Discidae – terrestrial
 Discus rotundatus rotundatus (O.F. Müller, 1774)

 Arionidae (roundback slugs) – terrestrial
 Arion ater (Linnaeus, 1758)
 Arion flagellus Collinge, 1893 – probably introduced
 Arion vulgaris Moquin-Tandon, 1855 = (misapplied) Arion lusitanicus Mabille, 1868 – introduced
 Arion subfuscus Draparnaud, 1805
 Arion fuscus (O.F. Müller, 1774) – possibly introduced
 Arion circumscriptus Johnston, 1828
 Arion rufus (Linnaeus, 1758)
 (Arion silvaticus Lohmander, 1937, currently considered a variety of A. circumscriptus)

 Arion fasciatus (Nilsson, 1823) – probably introduced
 Arion hortensis A. Férussac, 1819
 Arion distinctus J. Mabille, 1868
 Arion owenii Davies, 1979
 Arion intermedius (Normand, 1852)
 Arion occultus Anderson, 2004 – introduced
 Geomalacus maculosus Allman, 1843 – introduced

 Pristilomatidae – terrestrial
 Vitrea contracta (Westerlund, 1871)
 Vitrea crystallina (O.F. Müller, 1774)

 Euconulidae – terrestrial
 Euconulus fulvus (O.F. Müller, 1774)
 Euconulus alderi (J.E. Gray, 1840)
 Gastrodontidae – terrestrial
 Zonitoides nitidus (O.F. Müller, 1774)
 Zonitoides excavatus (Alder, 1830)

 Oxychilidae – terrestrial
 Oxychilus alliarius (Miller, 1822)
 Oxychilus cellarius (O.F. Müller, 1774)
 Oxychilus draparnaudi draparnaudi (Beck, 1837) – introduced
 Oxychilus navarricus helveticus (Blum, 1881) – introduced
 Aegopinella nitidula (Draparnaud, 1805)
 Aegopinella pura (Alder, 1830)
 Nesovitrea hammonis (Ström, 1765) =Perpolita hammonis

 Milacidae – terrestrial
 Milax gagates (Draparnaud, 1801)
 Tandonia rustica (Millet, 1843)
 Tandonia budapestensis (Hazay, 1881) – introduced
 Tandonia sowerbyi (A. Férussac, 1823)
 Tandonia cf. cristata (Kaleniczenko, 1851) – introduced

 Vitrinidae – terrestrial
 Vitrina pellucida (O.F. Müller, 1774)
 Semilimax pyrenaicus (A. Férussac, 1821) – introduced?

 Boettgerillidae – terrestrial
 Boettgerilla pallens Simroth, 1912 – introduced

 Limacidae (keelback slugs) – terrestrial
 Limax maximus Linnaeus, 1758
 Limax cinereoniger Wolf, 1803
 Limacus flavus (Linnaeus, 1758) – introduced
 Limax maculatus (Kaleniczenko, 1851) – introduced
 Lehmannia marginata (O.F. Müller, 1774)
 Ambigolimax valentianus (A. Férussac, 1822) – introduced
 Ambigolimax parvipenis Hutchinson, Reise & Schlitt, 2022 – introduced

 Agriolimacidae – terrestrial
 Deroceras laeve (O.F. Müller, 1774)
 Deroceras reticulatum (O.F. Müller, 1774)
 Deroceras invadens Reise, Hutchinson, Schunack & Schlitt, 2011 – introduced
 Deroceras panormitanum (Lessona & Pollonera, 1882) – introduced

 Ferussaciidae – terrestrial
 Cecilioides acicula (O.F. Müller, 1774) – probably introduced

 Clausiliidae (door snails) – terrestrial
 Cochlodina laminata (Montagu, 1803)
 Clausilia bidentata bidentata (Ström, 1765)
 Balea perversa (Linnaeus, 1758)
 Balea sarsii Pfeiffer, 1847

 Testacellidae (shelled slugs) – terrestrial
 Testacella maugei A. Férussac, 1822 – probably introduced
 Testacella haliotidea Draparnaud, 1801 – probably introduced
 Testacella scutulum Sowerby, 1821 – probably introduced
 Testacella sp. "tenuipenis" – probably introduced 

 Cochlicellidae – terrestrial
 Cochlicella acuta (O.F. Müller, 1774) – introduced

 Hygromiidae – terrestrial

 Ashfordia granulata (Alder, 1830)
 Candidula gigaxii (L. Pfeiffer, 1850) – introduced
 Candidula intersecta (Poiret, 1801) – introduced
 Cernuella virgata (Da Costa, 1778) – probably introduced
 Helicella itala itala (Linnaeus, 1758)
 Hygromia cinctella (Draparnaud, 1801) – introduced
 Trochulus hispidus (Linnaeus, 1758)
 Trochulus striolatus (Pfeiffer, 1828)
 Zenobiella subrufescens (Miller, 1822)

 Helicidae – terrestrial
 Arianta arbustorum arbustorum (Linnaeus, 1758)
 Helicigona lapicida lapicida (Linnaeus, 1758)
 Theba pisana pisana (O.F. Müller, 1774) – introduced
 Cepaea nemoralis nemoralis (Linnaeus, 1758)
 Cepaea hortensis (O.F. Müller, 1774)
 Cornu aspersum aspersum = Helix aspersa (O.F. Müller, 1774) – introduced

Bivalvia

 Margaritiferidae – aquatic
 Margaritifera margaritifera (Linnaeus, 1758)

 Unionidae (river mussels) – aquatic
 Anodonta anatina (Linnaeus, 1758)
 Anodonta cygnea (Linnaeus, 1758)

 Sphaeriidae (pea clams, fingernail clams) – aquatic
 Sphaerium corneum (Linnaeus, 1758)
 Sphaerium nucleus (Studer, 1820)
 Musculium lacustre (O.F. Müller, 1774)
 Pisidium amnicum (O.F. Müller, 1774)
 Pisidium casertanum (Poli, 1791)
 Pisidium conventus (Clessin, 1877)
 Pisidium henslowanum (Sheppard, 1823)
 Pisidium hibernicum Westerlund, 1894
 Pisidium lilljeborgii (Clessin, 1886)
 Pisidium milium Held, 1836

 Pisidium moitessierianum Paladilhe, 1866
 Pisidium nitidum Jenyns, 1832
 Pisidium obtusale (Lamarck, 1818)
 Pisidium personatum Malm, 1855
 Pisidium pulchellum (Jenyns, 1832)
 Pisidium pseudosphaerium Favre, 1927
 Pisidium subtruncatum Malm, 1855

 Dreissenidae – aquatic
 Dreissena polymorpha (Pallas, 1771) – introduced
 Dreissena bugensis (Andrusov, 1897) – introduced

 Corbiculidae (basket clams) – aquatic
Corbicula fluminea (O.F. Müller, 1774) – introduced

List of "hothouse alien" species

These freshwater species are not truly part of the fauna, because they do not live in the wild. They are tropical, and thus are incapable of surviving in the wild in Ireland; instead they have established themselves as uninvited inhabitants of aquaria within greenhouses, and similar artificially-heated aquatic habitats.

 Lymnaeidae – aquatic
 Radix rubiginosa (Michelin, 1831), native to Indo-China and Indonesia

 Planorbidae – aquatic
 Planorbella duryi (Wetherby, 1879)

See also
 List of marine molluscs of Ireland
 Biota of the Isle of Man#Mollusca (molluscs)
 List of non-marine molluscs of Great Britain
 List of non-marine molluscs of the Netherlands

References

Further reading 
 Scharff, R. F. 1896. The slugs of Ireland. London.
Rev. Canon J.W. Horsley Our British snails. London :Society for Promoting Christian Knowledge,1915.  pdf (BHL) Beginners text and plates
George Brettingham Sowerby  Illustrated Index of British Shells  (1859) s:Illustrated Index of British Shells Wikisource full text and plates
Germain, L. Faune de France n° 21  Mollusques terrestres et fluviatiles. vol I. 1930, 478 p.pdf
Germain, L. Faune de France n° 22  Mollusques terrestres et fluviatiles. vol. II. 1931, 520 p. 390 fig.pdf
Germain, L. Illustrations des Faunes n° 21-22 Mollusques terrestres et fluviatiles pdf
Francisco Welter-Schultes, 2012. European non-marine molluscs, a guide for species identification. Bestimmungsbuch für europäische Land- und Süsswassermollusken. Planet Poster Editions, Göttingen.
George Washington Tryon article lists all parts of Manual of conchology 1887-1935 with online links.
George W. Tryon, Jr., Henry Augustus Pilsbry and B. Sharp Manual of conchology, structural and systematic : with illustrations of the species Philadelphia :Published by the Author, Academy of Natural Sciences,1879-1898 Series 1 17 volumes online here
George W. Tryon, Jr.,Horace Burrington Baker, Charles Montague Cooke, Alpheus Hyatt, Henry Augustus Pilsbry, Manual of conchology, structural and systematic : with illustrations of the species. by George W. Tryon, Jr. Second series, Pulmonata Philadelphia :Published by the Author,1885-1935. 28 volumes and indices online here

External links
 An annotated list of the non-marine molluscs of Britain and Ireland
The Living World of Snails Robert Nordsieck Austria Highly recommended site
MolluscIreland
Invertebrate Ireland Online Partially illustrated checklist
 Northern Ireland's Priority Species & Species of Conservation Concern. Molluscs.
 Conchological Society Identification help.
 BDH Taylor, John William, Roebuck, William Denison and Ashford, Charles, 1829-1894 Monograph of the land & freshwater Mollusca of the British isles Leeds, Taylor Brothers Parts 8 -24. (all parts U.S. Archive
National Biodiversity Network  Species distribution maps
Irish Biodiversity Maps - including non-marine molluscs
Molluscs of Central Europe Taxonomy. Images
 L. Watson and M. J. Dallwitz The families of British non-marine molluscs (slugs, snails and mussels)
Mollusca Slovenska Ecology Distribution (in text)

moll
Ireland
Ireland
Ireland